Polygonum argyrocoleon, common names silver-sheath knotweed and Persian knotweed, is an Asian species of plants in the buckwheat family. It is native to Siberia, western China, Central Asia, and the Middle East. It has also become naturalized in parts of the United States, primarily the Southwest, and northwestern Mexico.

References

External links
Line Drawing from Flora Palaestina

argyrocoleon
Flora of Asia
Plants described in 1847